Heteropsomys is an extinct genus of rodent in the family Echimyidae. 
It contains the following species:
 Antillean cave rat (Heteropsomys antillensis)
 Insular cave rat (Heteropsomys insulans)

 
Extinct rodents
Rodent genera
Holocene extinctions